Gottfried Creek is a stream in the U.S. state of Florida.

Gottfried Creek took the name of the Gottfried family, the original owners of the land where the creek is located.

See also
List of rivers of Florida

References

Rivers of Charlotte County, Florida
Rivers of Sarasota County, Florida
Rivers of Florida